Laura Mary Smyth (born 12 November 1976), an Australian politician, was a member of the Australian House of Representatives for the seat of La Trobe representing the Australian Labor Party. She defeated Liberal MP Jason Wood at the 2010 federal election. She was defeated by Wood at the 2013 election.

Early years and background
Smyth was educated at St Lukes Primary School, Twinbrook, Belfast, County Antrim, Dandenong and Oakleigh before attending Monash University, where she completed a Bachelor of Science (Honours) and a Bachelor of Laws. She worked as a corporate lawyer for almost ten years, and studied at the University of Melbourne for a Master's in law (LLM).

References

1976 births
Living people
Australian Labor Party members of the Parliament of Australia
Members of the Australian House of Representatives
Members of the Australian House of Representatives for La Trobe
Monash University alumni
Northern Ireland emigrants to Australia
People who lost British citizenship
People who lost Irish citizenship
Naturalised citizens of Australia
Women members of the Australian House of Representatives
University of Melbourne alumni
21st-century Australian politicians
21st-century Australian women politicians